The Battle of Matejče (Macedonian: Битката кај Матејче , Albanian: Beteja e Mateçit)  was a military confrontation between Albanian rebels of the NLA and the Macedonian Army in the village of Matejče during the insurgency in Macedonia. Albanian rebels succeeded in capturing the village on 5 June 2001.

Battle

Initial NLA attack 
On 24 March 2001, dozens of NLA insurgents entered Matejče and attacked the local police station.

Macedonian Offensive 
On 26 March, Macedonians launched a large scale offensive in the village. Macedonian Forces succeeded in retaking much of the village and pushing the NLA to the very outskirts of the village.

During the offensive one Macedonian soldier was wounded by NLA mortar fire.

NLA Counter-offensive and Main combat phase 
The next day after the successful Macedonian offensive, on March 27, the NLA began a counter-offensive, attacking the Macedonian forces with heavy mortar and sniper fire, eventually capturing the a part of the village and surrounding the local police station.

On the same day a Macedonian Army convoy of around 20 APC's, three T-55 tanks and a bus with policemen were send to the village. Later that day the Macedonian Army also used helicopter gunships, artillery and tanks to target suspected guerrilla positions in Matejče.

Fighting resumed the next day, with the NLA using five 120-millimeter mortar shells.

During the fighting on 30 March, an Macedonian truck ran over an NLA planted mine, killing 1 Soldier and wounding 2 others.

From 1 to 3 June, Macedonian forces again shelled the village and again tried to regain control of the village. During their Offensive the Macedonian Army used their entire combat arsenal, including the helicopters. But on June 5 the NLA captured the entire village and Macedonian forces were forced to withdraw from the village. On 6 June the NLA confirmed to have regained complete control over Matejče and Vaksince and declared that it had liberated the entire Karadak of Kumanovo.

Aftermath 
During the battle nine NLA insurgents were killed, most of them while they were trying to regain lost ground during the NLA counter-offensive. One Macedonian T-55 Tank was destroyed. According to Macedonian sources, the tank was destroyed by friendly fire, although there is footage of the NLA destroying the tank. The village mosque was completely destroyed during the fighting. 8 Serbs were arrested by the NLA and on 11 June the Matejce orthodox church as well as homes of ethnic Macedonians were destroyed by the Albanian rebels.

Macedonian propaganda later claimed the NLA were holding civilians as human shields, this claim was proven false when local civilians admitted they were staying in the combat zone out of fear of falling into the hands of the Macedonian police.

References 

2001 insurgency in Macedonia